Michele Soavi, sometimes known as Michael Soavi (born 3 July 1957) is an Italian filmmaker, actor, and screenwriter best known for his work in the horror film genre, working alongside directors like Dario Argento and Lucio Fulci.

Career
Michele Soavi was born in Milan. As a teenager, Soavi enrolled in creative arts classes and worked at becoming an actor. He took acting lessons at Milan's Fersen Studios, and also served as a cameraman. Soavi's directorial career began when he was offered an assistant director job by Marco Modugno after appearing as an extra in Modugno's 1979 film Bambule. Soavi continued to act in films such as Alien 2: On Earth and Lucio Fulci's City of the Living Dead, and served as an assistant director to Aristide Massacessi (Joe D'Amato), and occasionally appeared in bit parts in some of D'Amato's films. Soavi later came into his own when he started his collaboration with famed Italian horror director Dario Argento, who used him as second assistant director on the film Tenebrae. Soavi continued to work with Argento for several years; with his first credit as director being the documentary Dario Argento's World of Horror, followed by a pop promo for Bill Wyman. He directed his first feature film with 1987's Stage Fright for producer Joe D'Amato. He worked as assistant director to Terry Gilliam on The Adventures of Baron Munchausen in 1988, and followed this with his second feature film as director, 1989's La Chiesa (The Church). His third feature, The Sect (a.k.a. "The Devil's Daughter"), followed in 1990.

Soavi has been credited as continuing the traditions of Italian horror in the 1990s, directing the zombie love story Dellamorte Dellamore (a.k.a. Cemetery Man). The film was based on Tiziano Sclavi's novel of the same name, and the author was also known for being the creator of the Italian comic book Dylan Dog. "Dellamorte Dellamore" also starred Rupert Everett in the lead role. Soavi retreated from the film industry in the mid-1990s to care for his ailing son, before returning to work in Italian television. In 2008, it was announced that Soavi was working on a new feature film, The Catacombs Club.

Filmography

As director
Dario Argento's World of Horror (1985) documentary
The Valley (1985 short)
Stage Fright (1987)
The Church (1989) a.k.a. Demons 3
The Sect (1991) a.k.a. The Devil's Daughter or Demons 4
Cemetery Man (1994)  a.k.a. Dellamorte Dellamore
Ultimo 2 - La sfida (1999)
Uno bianca (2001)
Il testimone (2001)
St. Francis (2002)
Ultima pallottola (2003)
Ultimo 3 - L'infiltrato (2004)
The Goodbye Kiss (2006)
Political Target (2006)
Nassiryia - Per non dimenticare (2007)
Blood of the Losers (2008)
Adriano Olivetti: La forza di un Sogno (2013)
Sfida al cielo - La narcotici 2 (2015)
Rocco Chinnici (2017)
The Legend of the Christmas Witch (2018)

As assistant / second unit director
2020 Texas Gladiators (1982)
Tenebrae (1982)
A Blade in the Dark (1983 - actor)
Endgame (1983)
Blastfighter (1984)
Phenomena (1985 - also actor)
Demons (1985)
Opera (1987)
The Adventures of Baron Munchausen (1988)
The Brothers Grimm (2005)

As actor
Soavi makes cameos in all the films he directed and assistant directed prior to 2000. He has also acted, usually uncredited, in numerous films from other Italian horror directors.

The Greatest Battle (1978)
Little Lips (1978)
Alien 2: On Earth (also known as Alien Terror) (1980)
City of the Living Dead (also known as The Gates Of Hell) (1980)
Day of the Cobra (1980)
Absurd (a.k.a. Anthropophagus 2) (1981)
Caligula II: The Untold Story (1982)
The New York Ripper (1982)
The Atlantis Interceptors (also known as Atlantis Inferno) (1983)
Dèmoni (1985) a.k.a. Demons
The Black Cat (1989) a.k.a. De Profundis or Demons 6

References

External links

1957 births
Italian male actors
Italian film directors
Giallo film directors
Horror film directors
Living people
Film people from Milan